Christopher Joseph Lennertz (born January 2, 1972) is an American composer, songwriter, and conductor of film, television, and video game scores. His musical scores appeared in Alvin and the Chipmunks, Hop, Think Like a Man, and Horrible Bosses, and  the video game series Medal of Honor, created by Steven Spielberg. He composed the score for Supernatural and more recently Revolution, two television series created by Eric Kripke. He also scored Galavant and Sausage Party with Alan Menken and Marvel's Agent Carter including a first ever Marvel musical number co-written with Tony award winning lyricist David Zippel. He wrote the songs for UglyDolls with Glenn Slater for Kelly Clarkson, Nick Jonas, Lizzo, Janelle Monae, and Blake Shelton. Currently he composes the score for the Netflix series Lost in Space and the Amazon Prime Video series The Boys from Kripke, Seth Rogen and Evan Goldberg.

Life and career 
Lennertz was born in Methuen, Massachusetts. He attended Easton Area High School in Easton, Pennsylvania and then Thornton School of Music at the University of Southern California, where he studied with Academy Award-winner Elmer Bernstein.

Lennertz has written music for a variety of comedies such as Horrible Bosses, Ride Along, as well as Identity Thief, and Think Like a Man. He has also worked on hit family films including Hop, and Alvin and the Chipmunks and critically acclaimed dramas Adam and Thanks For Sharing.

He has worked with artists including Basil Poledouris, Michael Kamen, Ozomatli, Dave Grusin, Alan Menken, The RZA, Five For Fighting, and Alien Ant Farm. His collaboration with Ozomatli on their record Street Signs garnered a Grammy Award for Best Latin Rock Album.

He was named best new composer in 2002 for his score to Clive Barker's Saint Sinner. He won several awards for his 2003 soundtrack to Medal of Honor: Rising Sun, the first of three Medal of Honor games composed by Lennertz. In 2006 he was nominated for an Emmy for Outstanding Musical Composition in a Series for his score for the pilot of the television series Supernatural, and he is the first recipient of the Film & TV Music Award for Best Score for an Independent Feature Film for Tortilla Heaven.

Filmography

Films

2000s

2010s

2020s

Television

Video games

References

External links 

Christopher Lennertz interview with Tracksounds

1972 births
Living people
American film score composers
American male film score composers
American television composers
Animation composers
Easton Area High School alumni
La-La Land Records artists
Male television composers
Musicians from Easton, Pennsylvania
USC Thornton School of Music alumni
Video game composers